George Washington Anderson (May 22, 1832 – February 26, 1902) was an American slave owner, lawyer and Republican politician from St. Louis, Missouri. He represented Missouri in the U.S. House from 1865 until 1869.

References

External links

1832 births
1902 deaths
American slave owners
Politicians from St. Louis
Republican Party members of the United States House of Representatives from Missouri
19th-century American politicians